Cutting Room is an American horror/comedy film written and directed by Ian Truitner, and starring Elizabeth Daily, Jon Polito, Weetus Cren, Richard T. Jones and Mark Elias.

Plot 
Charles Drake, maker of C-grade low-budget exploitation films, has brought on neophyte director Ed Smith for his latest bit of twaddle, "Curse of the Killer", based on an unfinished script penned by Ed himself. Ed fancies this opportunity as his big break, though he is alone in this belief as most everyone else involved with the meandering project sees it for what it is. Everything turns a darker shade of weird when people involved with the production start getting gruesomely killed off one by one. Charles, who has a history of dealing with nefarious characters, suspects the person responsible for the body count is a mob boss who is funding the film, but no one knows for sure. In the end, will there be anyone left to complete the film, or will the prophecy in the script "Curse of the Killer" turn into a reality?

Cast 

Elizabeth Daily as Joanne Kramer
Mark Elias as Ed Smith
Weetus Cren as Charles Drake
Richard T. Jones as Steve
Jon Polito as Sandy
Lindsey Labrum as Mindy
Chopper Bernet as Detective Masters
Dimitri Lekkos as Brock Steele
Joe Marinelli as Vincent
Garrison Koch as Nicky Dorfman
Tony Keyes as Manuel Orosco III
Kristy Jean Hulslander as Drew
Tess Parker as Annie
Paige Peterson as Vanessa
Riley Weston as Sitcom Girl

Release 
The film premiered in 2006 at the Milan International Film Festival (MIFF) and was distributed by Anthem Pictures. In 2010 the film was renamed "Wide Scream" for its Australian release.

References

External links 
 
 

2006 films
American comedy horror films
American independent films
2000s English-language films
2000s American films